The 1987 South Australian Soccer Federation season was the 81st season of soccer in South Australia.

1987 SASF Division One

The 1987 South Australian Division One season was the top level domestic association football competition in South Australia for 1987. It was contested by 12 teams in a 22-round league format, each team playing all of their opponents twice.

League table

1987 Coca Cola Challenge Cup
The 1987 Coca Cola Challenge Cup was a knockout competition, contested by the top four teams from the Division One season.

Bracket

1987 SASF Division Two

The 1987 South Australian Division Two season was the second level domestic association football competition in South Australia for 1987. It was contested by 10 teams in a 18-round league format, each team playing all of their opponents twice.

League table

References

1987 in Australian soccer
Football South Australia seasons